Silk is produced by a variety of animals, for different purposes, with various types being produced.

Insects
Silkworms produce silk when undergoing larval to adult metamorphosis. This includes not only the domesticated Bombyx mori, but a wide range of moth species, several of which are commercially exploited for silk.
Raspy crickets produce silk to form nests.
Honeybee and bumblebee larvae produce silk to strengthen the wax cells in which they pupate.
Bulldog ants spin cocoons to protect themselves during pupation.
Weaver ants use silk to connect leaves together to make communal nests.
Caddisfly larvae produce silk.
Webspinners have silk glands on their front legs.
Hornets
Silverfish
Mayflies
Thrips
Leafhoppers produce silk nests under the leaves of the trees where they live, to protect them against predators.
Beetles
Lacewings
Fleas
Flies
Midges
Caterpillars of many butterfly species use silk to create shelters or attach to substrates for pupation.
Parasitic wasps such as braconids use silk cocoons for pupation.

Other animals
The family Projapygidae in the order Diplura have cerci that contain silk glands.
The mussel Pinna nobilis creates silk to bond itself to rocks.  It is used to make sea silk.
Spiders make spider silk for various purposes such as weaving their webs, protecting their eggs or as a safety line.
The ampiphod Peramphithoe femorata uses silk to make a nest out of kelp blades. Another ampiphod, Crassicorophium bonellii, use silk to build shelter.
Carp produce fibroin units, a component of silk, to attach their eggs to rocks.
Spider mites make webs that protects them against predators.
Pseudoscorpions make silk chambers in which they molt.
Goats have been genetically modified to produce milk containing extractable silk proteins.

References

External links
US National Library of Medicine, National Institutes of Health, documentation about various animals that produce silk and why.

Animals
Silk
silk